Sydney Cope Morgan MBE QC (25 October 1887 – 14 October 1967), was a British barrister and Liberal Party politician.

Background
Morgan was the eldest son of George Ernest Morgan, of Cookham Dean, Berkshire. He was educated at Taunton School and Trinity College, Cambridge. In 1918 he was made a Member of the Order of the British Empire.

Professional career
Morgan served in the European War, 1914–18 as a Major in the South Wales Borderers. He received the Call to Bar in 1921. He was a Captain on the General List from 1940–44. In 1946 he was appointed a Queen's Counsel. He was Leader of the Parliamentary Bar from 1952–62. He became a Bencher, Middle Temple in 1954.

Political career
Morgan was Liberal candidate for the Cambridge division at the 1922 Cambridge by-election. The Liberal party had not contested the previous election when Labour came second. However, Morgan's campaign helped to re-establish the party as a political force in the borough;

He was again Liberal candidate for Cambridge at the 1922 General Election which took place shortly after. At this election he was able to improve the Liberal vote and take second place from the Labour party;

He was again Liberal candidate for Cambridge at the 1923 General Election. He achieved a 5% swing but this was not enough to unseat the sitting Unionist; 

He did not contest the 1924 General Election. He was Liberal candidate for the Northampton division at the 1928 Northampton by-election. The seat was a Unionist/Labour marginal which made it tough for a Liberal candidate. However, he managed to retain the level of support the party had won at the previous general election;

He did not stand for parliament again.

References

External links 
The Times Obituary: http://find.galegroup.com/ttda/infomark.do?&source=gale&prodId=TTDA&userGroupName=esusslib&tabID=T003&docPage=article&searchType=BasicSearchForm&docId=CS203779409&type=multipage&contentSet=LTO&version=1.0

1887 births
1967 deaths
Liberal Party (UK) parliamentary candidates
Alumni of Trinity College, Cambridge